Yehuda Atedji (יהודה אטדגי; born June 14, 1961) is an Israeli former Olympic windsurfer. He was born in Israel, and is Jewish.

Windsurfing career
He competed for Israel at the 1984 Summer Olympics in Los Angeles (at Long Beach, California) at the age of 23.  In Men's Windsurfer/Windglider (mistral) he came in 14th out of 38 competitors. His best result was his 5th place finish in Race 4. 
When he competed in the Olympics, he was 5-8.5 (174 cm) tall and weighed 150 lbs (68 kg).

References 

Living people
Israeli windsurfers
Olympic sailors of Israel
1961 births
Israeli Jews
Jewish sailors (sport)
Israeli male sailors (sport)
Sailors at the 1984 Summer Olympics – Windglider